Giovanni Andrea Croce (died 1595) was a Roman Catholic prelate who served as Bishop of Tivoli (1554–1595).

Biography
On 26 Jan 1554, Giovanni Andrea Croce was appointed during the papacy of Pope Julius III as Bishop of Tivoli.
He served as Bishop of Tivoli until his death on 2 Feb 1595.

While bishop, he was the principal co-consecrator of: Adriano Fuscone, Bishop of Aquino (1554); Gerolamo Melchiori, Bishop of Macerata (1554); and Massimiliano Palumbara, Archbishop of Benevento (1574).

References

External links and additional sources
 (for Chronology of Bishops) 
 (for Chronology of Bishops)  

16th-century Italian Roman Catholic bishops
Bishops appointed by Pope Julius III
1595 deaths